Donghuamen Subdistrict is a subdistrict at the center of Dongcheng District, Beijing, China. Tiananmen Square is located within this subdistrict. As of 2020, it has a total population of 38,090.

The subdistrict was named after the Donghua Gate located in the Eastern side of Forbidden City.

History

Administrative Division 
In 2006, there were 14 communities under Donghuamen subdistrict. With redistricting over the years, as of 2021 there are currently 10 communities within the subdistrict:

Famous Sites 

 Forbidden City
 Tiananmen Square
 Imperial Ancestral Temple
 Chairman Mao Memorial Hall
 Monument to the People's Heroes

See also
List of township-level divisions of Beijing

References

Dongcheng District, Beijing
Subdistricts of Beijing